The 2009 season is the Central Coast Mariners' second season of football (soccer) in Australia's women's league, the W-League.

Fixtures

 In the Round 5 match, Central Coast are the nominated home team, with the W-League match to be played as a curtain raiser to a men's A-League match.

Standings

Players

Player movement

In
 Rachel Cooper (Sydney FC)
 Jessica Seaman (Sydney FC)
 Samantha Spackman (Sydney FC)
 Caitlin Foord (AIS)
 Ashleigh Connor (Illawarra Stingrays)
 Kelly Golebiowski (Sydney FC)
 Michelle Heyman (Sydney FC)
 Jillian Loyden (Saint Louis Athletica)
 Kendall Fletcher (Saint Louis Athletica)
 Lydia Vandenbergh

Out
 Emma-Kate Dewhurst
 Lisa Hartley
 Katie Daly
 Hayley Abbott
 Jodie Bain
 Ellyse Perry (Canberra United)
 Kathryn Pryer
 Brooke Starrett
 Taryn Rockall
 Kyah Simon (Sydney FC)
 Emma Stewart

Leading scorers

The leading goal scorers from the regular season.

Squad statistics
Last updated 8 November 2009

Records
 First game = 3–1 win away V Sydney FC
 Largest win = 5–1 away V Newcastle Jets
 Largest loss = 1–0 away V Brisbane Roar

References

2009
Central Coast Mariners